Ray Panthaki (born 20 January 1979) is a British actor, producer, screenwriter and director.

Early life
Panthaki was born in London to second-generation Indian parents. His parents belong to India's Parsi minority community.

Career
Panthaki is best known for the roles he played on ITV and Netflix Original Series Marcella and Netflix Original Series Away alongside Hilary Swank and as Hassan B in Sacha Baron Cohen's Ali G Indahouse. He also appeared in the films Colette, Boiling Point, 28 Days Later, Official Secrets, Convenience Tube Tales, Provoked, Interview with a Hitman, It's a Wonderful Afterlife and the 2006 film Kidulthood, which he also produced.

In 2006, he was nominated for "Best Supporting Actor in a Play" at the TMA Theatre Awards for his role in Gladiator Games. Later that year, he set up the London-based production company Urban Way. Panthaki made his West End theatrical debut in July 2008 in the play In My Name at the Trafalgar Studios. He has performed twice at the Royal Court Theatre in London in Where Do We Live by Christopher Shinn and The Westbridge by Rachel De-Lehay. He went on to play a leading role in Tanika Gupta's The Empress for the Royal Shakespeare Company directed by Emma Rice. 

In 2013, Panthaki's directorial debut Life Sentence, a film which he also wrote, won Best UK Short at the East End Film Festival 2013. In 2013, Panthaki produced and starred in the comedy film Convenience starring alongside Vicky McClure and Adeel Akhtar. The film's director Keri Collins won 'Best Breakthrough' at the 2014 BAFTA Cymru for his work on the film. In 2014, he was announced as one of 18 BAFTA 'Breakthrough Brits' a celebration of Britain's stars of tomorrow alongside fellow actors Stacy Martin, Katie Leung and Callum Turner. In 2016, Panthaki was cast as DCI Rav Sangha in Hans Rosenfeldt's Nordic noir detective series Marcella.  In 2017, it was announced that Panthaki had signed on to Wash Westmoreland's Colette alongside Keira Knightley and Dominic West to play real-life French playwright Pierre Veber, in the biopic based on the French novelist Sidonie-Gabrielle Colette. Panthaki attended the world premier at the 2018 Sundance Film Festival alongside co-stars Keira Knightley and Dominic West, where the film received positive reviews.

In 2020 Panthaki appeared in the Netflix Original series Away, alongside Hilary Swank, as Group Captain Ram Arya, second in command on a mission to Mars.

In 2021 Panthaki was nominated for a British Independent Film Award for his role as Freeman in Boiling Point alongside Stephen Graham.

Filmography

References

External links 

1979 births
Living people
British male actors of Indian descent
English male actors
English producers
English screenwriters
English writers
English actors
English people of Indian descent
English people of Parsi descent
Male actors from London